SS Norse Lady was a cargo ship built by Wood, Skinner and Company of Newcastle upon Tyne to the United Kingdom's standard First World War "War C" design. She traded from 1920 until 1958, in which time she had six successive owners and four different names. In 1958 she ran aground in eastern Indonesia, was captured and beached by rebels, and then set on fire by a naval bombardment. She remained a wreck until 1966, when she was scrapped in Taiwan.

Owners and names
Wood, Skinner and Co laid her down in 1919 as War Glade, a standard "War" name for ships built under the UK's First World War merchant shipbuilding scheme. However, she was completed in January 1920 as Norefos for Skibs Aksjeselskap Thor Thoresens Linje of Norway, who registered her in Kristiania. In 1921 she was sold to Den Norske Amerikalinje Aksjeselskap ("Norwegian America Line") who renamed her Norefjord and added her to its Skandinaviske Øst-Afrika Linje ("Scandinavia East Africa Line") fleet. In 1949 she was sold to F.N. Nordbø of Haugesund, Norway who renamed her Ryvarden. She was laid up in Haugesund in 1953 and sold to Rolf Wigands Rederi of Bergen in 1954. Rolf Wigands sold her to Halvorsen Shipping Co of Bergen in 1956. She kept the name Ryvarden until 1958, when Halvorsen sold her to Pan-Norse Steamship Co of Panama, who renamed her Norse Lady.

Collisions

With Palembang, January 1942
On 8 January 1942 Norefjord was part of Convoy HX 169 from Nova Scotia en route to Great Britain when she collided with the Dutch ship . Both ships were damaged and returned to port for repairs. Norefjord returned to service by sailing with Convoy HX 175 on 13 February but again she returned to port. On 19 February Norefjord sailed with Convoy HX-176. This time she successfully completed the voyage, reaching Liverpool, England on 6 March 1942.

With Alcoa Rambler, August 1942
On 16 August 1942 Norefjord reached Halifax, Nova Scotia with Convoy BX 33 from Boston, Massachusetts. Having arrived, Norefjord was in Bedford Basin when she collided with the US cargo ship . Norefjord was damaged in the collision and subsequently beached.

Alcoa Rambler had been proceeding seawards, down the fairway, heading south-southeast. Rambler was laden with a cargo of explosives, was being escorted by a naval launch, and both Rambler and her escort were flying the warning flags required under local regulations. Norefjord had been crossing the fairway on an easterly course. The basin was congested with other ships, a number of changes of course were required, and Norefjord had repeatedly changed her course further to port before the two ships collided. The case between the owners of the two ships came to court in 1949 and its implications are now referred to in a guide to the International Regulations for Preventing Collisions at Sea.

Stranded and shelled, August 1958

On 14 August 1958 Norse Lady was off Parigi, Central Sulawesi, Indonesia when she ran aground. The rebels beached Norse Lady at Belang, but the Indonesian Navy sighted her there on 18 August, shelled her on 22 August and she was burnt out.

In March 1966 Hong Kong purchasers bought her wreck. They sold her to Taiwanese shipbreakers who towed Norse Lady to Kaohsiung, Taiwan and scrapped her.

References

Sources and further reading

Standard World War I ships
Ships built on the River Tyne
Steamships of Norway
1919 ships
Maritime incidents in 1958
Maritime incidents in Indonesia
Guided Democracy in Indonesia
Ships of Nortraship
Captured ships